Hans Reich (born 10 July 1942) is a retired German football player. He spent seven seasons in the Bundesliga with TSV 1860 München and Kickers Offenbach.

Honours 
 UEFA Cup Winners' Cup finalist: 1964–65
 Bundesliga champion: 1965–66
 DFB-Pokal winner: 1963–64, 1969–70
 Austrian Football Bundesliga champion: 1973–74

References

External links 
 

1942 births
Living people
German footballers
TSV 1860 Munich players
Kickers Offenbach players
LASK players
Bundesliga players
2. Bundesliga players
Association football defenders
Footballers from Munich
West German footballers
West German expatriate footballers
West German expatriate sportspeople in Austria
Expatriate footballers in Austria
Germany under-21 international footballers